Radhika Gupta (born 1983) is an Indian business executive. She is the chief executive officer (CEO) of Edelweiss Asset Management Limited.
Gupta started at Edelweiss Global Asset Management as business head of multi-strategy funds and was responsible for setting the strategic direction for the team’s investment, distribution and platform. She is India’s only female head of a major asset manager and has set up the country's first domestic hedge fund. She is known as "the girl with the broken neck".

Early life
Gupta was born to a diplomat father who was an Indian Foreign Service official. With her family, she moved across continents. She was born in Pakistan, where she had complications at her birth and she ended up with a broken neck which she describes is a "weird tilt" to her head.

Education
Gupta is a graduate of the Jerome Fisher Program in Management and Technology from the University of Pennsylvania. She received the Bachelor of Science in Engineering in Computer Science from University of Pennsylvania School of Engineering and Applied Science, and Bachelor of Science degree in Economics (Concentrations in Finance and Management) from the University of Pennsylvania - The Wharton School in 2005. She graduated summa cum laude - an honor awarded to a student whose grade point average (GPA) is between 3.80 and 4.00.

Career
Gupta started her career in 2005 at McKinsey & Company as a Business Analyst. In 2006, she was a part of the global asset allocation team at AQR Capital Management, LLC, as Portfolio Manager.

Along with Nalin Moniz and Anant Jatia, Gupta founded Forefront Capital Management in 2009, which was acquired by Edelweiss Financial Services Limited in 2014. In 2016, Gupta assisted with the acquisition of Ambit Alpha Fund and acquisition of the onshore business of JPMorgan Asset Management.

Prior to moving as CEO of Edelweiss Asset Management in 2017, Gupta headed Edelweiss Multi Strategy Funds Management Pvt. Ltd and was responsible for setting the strategic direction, overseeing investments, sales and distribution. She replaced Vikaas Sachdeva who was the previous CEO.

Book 
Hachette published her book - 'Limitless: The Power of Unlocking Your True Potential' in April 2022.

References 

Indian women business executives
Indian business executives
Businesspeople from Mumbai
Businesswomen from Maharashtra
Living people
1983 births